Turnbull Creek is a  long 3rd order tributary to the Cape Fear River in Bladen County, North Carolina.

Course
Turnbull Creek rises in between Bushy Lake and Rollins Pond, a Carolina Bay, about 5 miles east of Roseboro, North Carolina in Cumberland County.  Turnbull Creek then flows southeast to Bladen County to join the Cape Fear River about 1.5 miles east of Elizabethtown, North Carolina.

Watershed
Turnbull Creek drains  of area, receives about 49.1 in/year of precipitation, has a wetness index of 617.26 and is about 23% forested.

See also
List of rivers of North Carolina

References

Rivers of North Carolina
Rivers of Bladen County, North Carolina
Rivers of Cumberland County, North Carolina
Tributaries of the Cape Fear River